Short-term business statistics (STS) are economic statistics published by Eurostat, the statistical office of the European Commission. They cover all member states of the European Union and - in some areas - also third countries, and provide aggregated results for the euro area and the EU.
Short-term business statistics provide information on the economic development of four major domains: industry, construction, retail trade, and other services. These domains are defined in relation to a classification of economic activities, the NACE Rev.2 (Statistical Classification of Economic Activities in the European Community, second revision).

For the four domains the following variables are reported (most on a monthly, some on a quarterly basis):

 Industry: Production, turnover (domestic and non-domestic), number of persons employed, hours worked, gross wages and salaries, output prices (domestic and non-domestic), import prices.
 Construction: Production (total, of buildings and of civil engineering), number of persons employed, hours worked, gross wages and salaries, construction costs (material costs, wage costs), construction permits.
 Retail trade and repair: Turnover, retail trade volume, number of persons employed, hours worked, gross wages and salaries.
 Other services: Turnover, output prices (service producer prices), number of persons employed, hours worked, gross wages and salaries.

The legal authority for the European short-term business statistics is Regulation EC No 1165/98, as amended by Regulation EC No 1158/2005, and further implementing and amending regulations.

References

External links 
 Eurostat - Short-term business statistics
 Eurostat - Statistics Explained: all articles on short-term business statistics

European Commission
Economic data
Economy of the European Union
Year of establishment missing